The Erice statement is a statement written by Paul Dirac, Piotr Kapitza, and Antonino Zichichi asking for freedom of expression for scientists as well as for nuclear disarmament. It has been signed by over 90,000 scientists as well as numerous world leaders including  Mikhail Gorbachev, Ronald Reagan and Deng Xiaoping.

References

Scientific documents